Gervasio Deferr Ángel (born 7 November 1980) is a retired gymnast from Spain who competed at three Olympic Games. He became the Olympic champion in men's vault at the 2000 Summer Olympics in Sydney (scored 9.712) and repeated the feat at the 2004 Summer Olympics in Athens (scoring 9.737 average — vault 1 scored 9.687; vault 2 scored 9.787). Each of his ankles show a tattoo with the logo of one of these two Olympic Games. At the 2008 Summer Olympics in Beijing, he won the silver medal on the floor exercise with a score of 15.775. 

Deferr started in gymnastics at the age of five. He considered floor exercise as his favorite event and has had some success in major competitions. He finished in second place with the silver medal on floor at the 1999 World Artistic Gymnastics Championships with a score of 9.750 points, which he repeated eight years later with another silver medal at the 2007 World Artistic Gymnastics Championships, as well as many medals in the same apparatus in the Gymnastics World Cup, between them: World Cup 2000 in Ljubljana, Slovenia — 9.688 points (silver), or World Cup 2001 in Paris, France — 9.625 points (gold). He also finished second at the 2002 World Championships on floor exercise but the medal was taken away after he tested positive for marijuana.

In January 2011, Deferr announced his retirement.

A curious aspect of Deferr's personality is his stating that he considers sleeping a hobby. He also has an iguana as a pet and likes Japanese and Korean cultures. He even appeared on the Japanese game show Sasuke (Ninja Warrior in the United States), but failed to complete the first stage, being unable to make it over the 15 foot wall.

References

External links
 

1980 births
Living people
Spanish male artistic gymnasts
Gymnasts at the 2000 Summer Olympics
Gymnasts at the 2004 Summer Olympics
Gymnasts at the 2008 Summer Olympics
Gymnasts from Catalonia
Olympic gymnasts of Spain
Olympic gold medalists for Spain
Olympic silver medalists for Spain
Medalists at the World Artistic Gymnastics Championships
People from Premià de Mar
Sportspeople from the Province of Barcelona
Spanish people of Argentine descent
Sasuke (TV series) contestants
Olympic medalists in gymnastics
Medalists at the 2000 Summer Olympics
Medalists at the 2004 Summer Olympics
Medalists at the 2008 Summer Olympics
Doping cases in gymnastics
20th-century Spanish people
21st-century Spanish people